Broken & Beautiful is the debut album from Canadian pop rock artist Suzie McNeil, released on April 10, 2007 through Curve Music. It was preceded by the release of radio hit "Hung Up" and features the popular single "Believe", which served as an official anthem for the Canadian Olympic team in the 2010 Winter Olympics.

Critical reception

Matthew Chisling of AllMusic stated that the record was a strong effort where "...every single track individually is strong, and the best moments on the album are stronger than anything Kelly Clarkson ever recorded. With any luck, Broken and Beautiful will be a commercial success and McNeil will become the household name she deserves to be."

Track listing

Personnel
Adapted from the Broken & Beautiful liner notes.

 Marti Frederiksen – producer, mixing, engineering ("Hung Up" and "Skin")
 Brian Paturalski – mixing, engineering
 PK Pandey and John Shipp – engineering ("Believe")
 Dave Donnelly – mastering
 Kimberlee Miller – photography
 Joanne Howard – graphic design

Awards and nominations

Charts

Singles

References

2007 debut albums
Suzie McNeil albums
Universal Music Canada albums
Albums produced by Marti Frederiksen